Dear Mayang Street is a 2020 Chinese television series starring Xu Weizhou , Tan Songyun and Niu Junfeng. The story starts in 1984 and tells of the youths of Mayang Street through adulthood.

Synopsis
Mayang street in Guangzhou, early 1980s, Ou Xiaojian who grew up here dropped out of the police school and became a gangster on the street. Ma Xiaoxiao who grew up with him here couldn't understand his change. They had a fight about it and it was seen by Yi Dongdong who had  a crush on Ma Xiaoxiao. Yi Dongdong had just moved here with his family and quickly became friends with a bunch of guys on the street who had similar age as him. A whirl of things gradually got him connected to Ma Xiaoxiao and Ou Xiaojian as well. The story is about their wild youthful years on the Mayang street.

Cast

Main
Xu Weizhou as Ou Xiaojian
Tan Songyun as Ma Xiaoxiao
Niu Junfeng as Yi Dongdong

Supporting
Hu Haobo as Sun Sun
Li Nan as Ma Dada
Yi Zhixuan as Zeng Hang
Yu Xiang as Liang Xiaobao
Yu Xinyi as Zeng Hao
Gong Rui as Yi Nannan
Liu Yiran as Yi Xixi
Chen Jin as Niu Zilai
Shi Ke as Hao Pushi
Jiao Gang as Yi Shengli
Sun Lin as Lin Jiahao
Yu Wentong as Liang Yuanchao
Tian Min as Chen Lili
Chang Kaining as Ma Yingjun
Mu Liyan as Granny Zeng
Luo Yinan as Zeng Zhenmei
Ma Dongting as Sun Benyan

Production
The series began filming in April 2019 in Guangzhou, and wrapped up in August 2019.

References 

Chinese romance television series
Chinese period television series
2020 Chinese television series debuts
Television series by SMG Pictures